Siddington may refer to:

Siddington, Cheshire, England
Siddington, Gloucestershire, England